Roundhouse Park is a 17 acre (6.9 ha) park in the downtown core of Toronto, Ontario, Canada. It is in the former Railway Lands. It features the John Street Roundhouse,  a preserved locomotive roundhouse which is home to the Toronto Railway Museum, Steam Whistle Brewing, and the restaurant and entertainment complex The Rec Room. The park is also home to a collection of trains, the former Canadian Pacific Railway Don Station, and the Roundhouse Park Miniature Railway. The park is bounded by Bremner Boulevard, Lower Simcoe Street, Lake Shore Boulevard West/Gardiner Expressway and Rees Street.

History
The  John Street Roundhouse was built in 1929-31. Following the renovations of the roundhouse in the 1990s, the area to the east of the building became a city-owned park named Roundhouse Park in 1997. The Toronto Railway Museum occupies Roundhouse Park and officially opened in 2010. The Museum occupies three stalls of the John St. Roundhouse and features an indoor display, an indoor restoration facility, a full-size diesel cab simulator, an outdoor miniature railway, numerous railway engines and rolling stock as well as a fully restored railway village which includes Don Station, Signal Cabin D (with toolshed), a watchman's shanty, a water tower and a coaling tower.

John Street Roundhouse

The John Street Roundhouse was built for the Canadian Pacific Railway (CPR) in 1929–1931 by Anglin-Norcross to replace the earlier John Street roundhouse built in 1897. Trains were so properly maintained at this location that railroaders recognized them by their "John Street polish". When diesel-run trains began being used, business slowed at the roundhouse, and the building was last used for its original purpose in 1986. The CPR donated the roundhouse to the City of Toronto.

It is the only remaining roundhouse in downtown Toronto (the CNR Spadina Roundhouse was demolished to make way for construction of the SkyDome). One-third of the original structure was dismantled, to allow construction of the Metro Toronto Convention Centre below, then reconstructed (1995) by Hotson Bakker Architects and is now home to Steam Whistle Brewing. Renovations to the brewery interior were done by William Hurst Architects. The remaining two-thirds was rehabilitated by IBI Group Architects and now house the Toronto Railway Museum and Cineplex's Rec Room entertainment complex. The turntable and courtyard, Roundhouse Park with the restored wooden railway buildings was also completed by IBI and has received a number of design awards. The SkyWalk retains a direct connection from the Roundhouse Park, to Union Station.

John Street Roundhouse could maintain 32 locomotives at a time. 32 bay doors make up the inner rounded façade of the building and face the  turntable. This turntable was the largest used by the CPR and was constructed by the Canadian Bridge Company. The exterior and interior of the building are mostly composed of brick and glazing. Each of the bay doors is of wood construction and can be left open to reveal a floor-to-ceiling glass wall with a regular-sized man door inset. Natural light floods the interior space from the curved loft space and all exterior façades. Refurbished wooden columns also stand within the interior of the structure. The coaling tower and water tank are auxiliary structures still located in the park from the working days of the John Street Roundhouse.

The John Street Roundhouse was designated a national historic site of Canada in 1990.

The roundhouse and associated structures were first protected under Part IV of the Ontario Heritage Act, passed by Toronto City Council on August 12, 1996. It was then designated under Part V of the act with by-aw 634-2006 passed on July 27, 2006, as part of the Union Station Heritage Conservation District (encompassing the Park, Union Station and the Royal York Hotel).

Toronto Railway Museum

The Toronto Railway Historical Association (TRHA) was established in 2001 and is now incorporated as a federally registered charity. Its primary focus is the development of the Toronto Railway Museum (TRM).

The museum opened on May 28, 2010. The TRM operates year-round.  Cabin D has also been moved to Roundhouse Park from the City's collection of historic buildings and was repainted and repaired but remains in its original structural state.

Don Station

The Don Station was built in 1896 by Canadian Pacific Railway and was originally located at the Don River and Queen Street East along the western bank of the river. In 1969, it was moved to Todmorden Mills. For many years while it was there, the station was boarded up and not open to the public. Upon its relocation to the Roundhouse park, it was repainted and repaired and opened to the public to purchase tickets for the Roundhouse Park Miniature Railway.

Miniature Railway
The Toronto Railway Museum's Miniature Railway opened in 2010 within Roundhouse Park provides rides to visitors to the museum in season. The ride has 4 cars carrying 4 passengers each, a caboose and is either towed by a replica steam locomotive/tender or replica CLC diesel-electric Whitcomb center-cab switcher.

Collection of trains
Roundhouse Park contains four full-sized locomotives, three freight cars, two passenger cars and one diesel multiple unit.

 Canadian National Railway No. 6213 U-2-G 4-8-4 MLW 1942 – formerly located at Exhibition Place
 Canadian Pacific 7020 Class DS10-B, Alco S-2 1944
 Canadian National Railway No. 4803 GMD GP7 1953
 Canadian Locomotive Company 50 Ton Whitcomb Centre Cab Switcher 1950
 Canadian Pacific "Jackman" sleeper 1931
 Canadian Pacific "Cape Race" Buffet-compartment-solarium-observation-sleeper, 1929
 Dominion Atlantic Railway "Sans Pareil" (now "Nova Scotia") Pullman dining car built in 1896
 Toronto, Hamilton & Buffalo Railway Caboose #70 steel sheathed, 1921
 Canadian Pacific Railway 188625 – "Fowler" steel frame boxcar, built 1917
 Reinhart Vinegars RVLX 101 – wooden vinegar tank car, built 1938
 Toronto Terminal Railway (TTR) – Pyke Self-Propelled Crane
 GO Transit Hawker Siddeley RTC-85SP/D diesel multiple unit, built 1967

Gallery

Other  Toronto roundhouses
 CNR Spadina Roundhouse demolished 1986 to make way for Rogers Centre
 CPR Lambton Roundhouse at St. Clair Avenue West and Runnymede Road, 1912–1913 (demolished 1960)
 CPR West Toronto Roundhouse, 1884, 1891 (demolished 2001)
 CPR Parkdale Roundhouse, King and Queen at Dufferin Street, 1891 by Credit Valley Railway; machinery and  turntable moved to John Street Roundhouse in 1897; last used 1907
CNR Mimico 34-stall Roundhouse, Mimico Yard (current site of the Via Toronto Maintenance Centre), built in 1913 by the Grand Trunk Railway, demolished in 1969 after a 1965 fire
CNR Danforth 31-stall Roundhouse, south and across the tracks from current Danforth GO station, 1884 by the Grand Trunk Railway, torn down 1940's

References

External links

 Official site
 John Street Roundhouse at Old Time Trains

Canadian Pacific Railway facilities
City of Toronto Heritage Properties
Museums in Toronto
Parks in Toronto
Railway Lands
Railway museums in Ontario
Railway roundhouses in Toronto
Transport infrastructure completed in 1931